Ford One is an EP by American hip hop group Atmosphere. It was released on Rhymesayers Entertainment in 2000. It is the first installment of the  Ford EP series, the second being Ford Two.

Track listing

References

External links
 

2000 EPs
Atmosphere (music group) albums
Rhymesayers Entertainment EPs